Onnia is a genus of trilobites from the late Ordovician of Africa, Europe, North America, and South America. Fossils have been found in Canada (Quebec), the Czech Republic, France, Morocco, Portugal, Spain, the United Kingdom, and Venezuela.

References

Further reading 
Fossils (Smithsonian Handbooks) by David Ward

External links 
 Onnia in the Paleobiology Database

Trinucleidae
Asaphida genera
Ordovician trilobites
Ordovician trilobites of Africa
Ordovician trilobites of Europe
Ordovician France
Ordovician trilobites of North America
Ordovician Canada
Paleozoic life of Quebec
Ordovician trilobites of South America
Ordovician Venezuela
Fossils of Venezuela
Fossil taxa described in 1933